Sand Lake is a village in Kent County in the U.S. state of Michigan. The population was 522 at the 2020 census.

History
In 2009, the village had the highest tax rates of the five villages in Kent County, and some residents petitioned for a vote to have the village disincorporated in order to lower taxes. This proposal was defeated, and Sand Lake continued as an incorporated village.

Geography

Demographics

2010 census
As of the census of 2010, there were 500 people, 188 households, and 116 families living in the village.  The population density was 625 per square mile.  There were 211 housing units at an average density of 263.75 per square mile.  The racial makeup of the village was 94.6% White, 0.80% African American, 0.2% Native American, 1% Asian, 1.4% from other races, and 2% from two or more races. Hispanic or Latino of any race were 5.2% of the population.

There were 188 households, of which 34% had children under the age of 18 living with them, 39.9% were married couples living together, 14.4% had a female householder with no husband present, and 38.3% were non-families. 33% of all households were made up of individuals, and 26.1% had someone living alone who was 65 years of age or older.  The average household size was 2.66 and the average family size was 3.34.

In the village, the population was spread out, with 33% under the age of 20, 7% from 20 to 24, 23.4% from 25 to 44, 24.8% from 45 to 64, and 11.8% who were 65 years of age or older.  The median age was 33.2 years. For every 100 females, there were 65.29 males.  For every 100 females age 20 and over, there were 95.91 males.

2000 census
As of the census of 2000, there were 492 people, 184 households, and 110 families living in the village. The racial makeup of the village was 96.34% White, 0.20% African American, 1.22% Native American, 0.81% Asian, 1.02% from other races, and 0.41% from two or more races. Hispanic or Latino of any race were 1.02% of the population.

There were 184 households, out of which 35.9% had children under the age of 18 living with them, 47.3% were married couples living together, 9.8% had a female householder with no husband present, and 40.2% were non-families. 34.2% of all households were made up of individuals, and 19.6% had someone living alone who was 65 years of age or older.  The average household size was 2.64 and the average family size was 3.43.

In the village, the population was spread out, with 32.1% under the age of 18, 8.3% from 18 to 24, 28.7% from 25 to 44, 15.0% from 45 to 64, and 15.9% who were 65 years of age or older.  The median age was 33 years. For every 100 females, there were 85.7 males.  For every 100 females age 18 and over, there were 80.5 males.

The median income for a household in the village was $31,875, and the median income for a family was $46,250. Males had a median income of $27,500 versus $21,985 for females. The per capita income for the village was $14,184.  About 9.3% of families and 14.5% of the population were below the poverty line, including 9.0% of those under age 18 and 34.0% of those age 65 or over.

Education
Tri County Area Schools, which operates Tri County High School, serves Sand Lake. The district was a consolidation of the Sand Lake and Howard City school boards. It came into existence on April 3, 1962, the day members of those communities voted in favor of consolidating their schools. The consolidated schools began operation in fall 1962.

Prior to the consolidation, Sand Lake High School, a K-12 school, served the community. Impetus for consolidation occurred when the State of Michigan adopted new standards for education which required school systems to spend additional funds. Some Sand Lake residents wished to consolidate with Cedar Springs Schools in Cedar Springs due to the strength of the Cedar Springs industrial economy and the good reputation of its school system, while others wished to consolidate with Howard City. Charles Northup, a former member of the Sand Lake school board, stated that Cedar Springs residents would have had primary control and naming of a consolidated school district including Sand Lake, while a consolidation with Howard City would result in joint control between the communities. According to a former principal of Sand Lake High, Earl Clegg, "community friction" occurred in the consolidation debate. About 300 people went to a meeting in Sand Lake on proposed school consolidation on February 13, 1961.

The Nelson Township Branch of the Kent District Library is located in Sand Lake.

Notable people
Dick Terwilliger, Major League Baseball pitcher

References

Villages in Kent County, Michigan
Villages in Michigan
Grand Rapids metropolitan area
Populated places established in 1869
1869 establishments in Michigan